Haceby is a hamlet in the civil parish of Newton and Haceby  in the district of North Kesteven, Lincolnshire, England.

In the Domesday account the village is written as "Hazebi". The -by suffix is a Scandinavian word ending, for a place name based on a personal name.  It is suggested that the origin is Farmstead or village of Haddr. 

Haceby consists of a small number of houses, farm buildings, and the  Grade I listed redundant St Barbara's Church. Although dedicated to St Barbara, it is also attributed to St Margaret  or to both saints.

Earthworks to the west of the village are still visible as the remains of a Roman Villa. In 1818 a tessellated pavement and other Roman remains were discovered.

The village's war memorial is found combined with that of Newton, in Newton's St Botolph Church.

References

External links
"Haceby", Genuki.org.uk. Retrieved 24 April 2012
"Haceby", Homepages.which.net

Hamlets in Lincolnshire
North Kesteven District